Harold Francis Youngblood (August 7, 1907 – May 10, 1983) was a politician from the U.S. state of Michigan. He served one term in the United States House of Representatives from 1947 to 1949.

Early life and career
Youngblood was born in Detroit, Michigan, attended the public schools, and graduated from St. Joseph’s Commercial College in 1927.  He was employed in Detroit office of the Secretary of State of Michigan in 1927 and 1928.  He was also a member of staff of Wayne County Board of Auditors 1928-1935.  In 1934 he ran for congress.  He was  defeated by Louis C. Rabaut.  He later engaged as a plumbing and heating contractor in 1940.

Congress
In 1947, Youngblood unseated Rabaut, and was elected as a Republican from Michigan's 14th congressional district to the 80th Congress, serving from January 3, 1947 to January 3, 1949 in the U.S. House.  He was an unsuccessful candidate for reelection in 1948 to the 81st Congress when Rabaut returned to defeat him.  He lost at four more attempts against his rival in 1948, 1950, 1952, and 1956.

After Congress
After leaving Congress, he served as special assistant to the Director of Foreign Operations Administration in the Berlin area in 1954 and 1955.  He was an unsuccessful candidate for Michigan House of Representatives from Wayne County (1st District) in 1958.  He then engaged in construction contracting.

Personal life
Youngblood was a Catholic and a member of Elks, and Lions. He was a resident of Tucson, Arizona until his death and is interred there in East Lawn Cemetery.

See also
 List of members of the House Un-American Activities Committee

References

The Political Graveyard

1907 births
Republican Party members of the United States House of Representatives from Michigan
1983 deaths
20th-century American politicians
Arizona Republicans